FC Ak-Zhol is a Kyrgyz football club based in Aravan, Kyrgyzstan that plays in the top division in Kyrgyzstan League that controls bye Football Federation of Kyrgyz Republic .

Aravan's football club shown by different names in the Kyrgyzstan League. The club plays its home games at Aravan Stadium. The best performance of the FC Ak-Zhol was Kyrgyzstan Cup 2005 by reached the Semi-finals.

History 
1997: Founded as FC Yangiyul Aravan.
1998: Renamed FC Druzhba Aravan.
2002: Renamed FC Ak Bula Aravan.
2004: Renamed Sharab-K Aravan.
2005: Renamed FC Dinamo Aravan.
2005: Renamed FC Al Fagir Aravan.
2006: Renamed FC Dinamo Aravan.
2010: Renamed FC Ak-Zhol Aravan.

Performance in Kyrgyzstan League
Kyrgyzstan Cup: 7 appearances
1997: 1/16 finals
2003: 1/16 finals
2004: 1/16 finals
2005: 1/4 Semi-finals
2006: 1/16 finals
2007: 1/32 finals
2008: 1/32 finals

Kyrgyzstan League: 5 appearances
2002 : 9th

2003 : 4th in Zone B

2005 : withdrew due to financial problems and started playing at the Kyrgyzstan League Second Level.

2006 : 5th in Group B

2010 : withdrew from Kyrgyzstan League due to political unrest in April 2010.

Kyrgyzstan League Second Level: 3 appearances
2001 : 1st in Zone B (South)

2004 : 2nd in Zone B-2 (Osh Region)

2005 : 5th in Southern Zone

References
Kyrgyzstan - List of final tables (RSSSF)

References and notes

Football clubs in Kyrgyzstan
1997 establishments in Kyrgyzstan
Association football clubs established in 1997